Mütesellim or mutesellim was an Ottoman gubernatorial title used to describe mainly the head of a nahiye, but also other positions within the Ottoman hierarchy, depending on the context. Mostly this title was used for civil governors of individual towns, who managed tax collection and maintained public order. In order to reduce conflicts between mütesellims, in some cases one mütesellim was appointed by the sanjak-bey as lieutenant governor in charge for the whole sanjak. The Ottoman Empire abolished the position of mütesellim in 1842. This position was often connected with conflicts between various parties who saw it as possibility to increase their personal wealth. In the period between 1842 and 1864 local military governors assisted by local administration were in charge for tax collection and control of the population instead of mütesellims. After 1864 and the creation of the vilayet system, the office of mütesellim was replaced with new position of mutasarrıf.

References 

Gubernatorial titles
Civil servants from the Ottoman Empire
Turkish words and phrases
Military ranks of the Ottoman Empire
Taxation in the Ottoman Empire